Rubén Ramírez Hidalgo and Santiago Ventura were the defenders of title, but Ventura chose not to compete this year.Ramírez Hidalgo partnered up with Rogier Wassen, but they lost to Martin Emmrich and Joseph Sirianni in the semifinals.
Dustin Brown and Rameez Junaid won in the final 6–3, 6–1, against Emmrich and Sirianni.

Seeds
The top two seeds receive a bye into the quarterfinals.

Draw

Draw

References
 Doubles Draw

Franken Challenge - Doubles
2010 Doubles